Jaswant Singh Shergill (born ) is a British male weightlifter, competing in the 62 kg category. He represented England at the 2014 Commonwealth Games in the 62 kg event.

Major competitions

References

1993 births
Living people
British male weightlifters
Place of birth missing (living people)
Weightlifters at the 2014 Commonwealth Games
Commonwealth Games competitors for England
Weightlifters at the 2022 Commonwealth Games